Reed Low (born June 21, 1976) is a Canadian former professional ice hockey player who played in the National Hockey League for five seasons. Low was known primarily for his role as an enforcer. Low twice accumulated over 50 penalty minutes in a single game (57 vs Calgary February 28, 2002, and 53 vs Detroit December 31, 2002).

Born in Moose Jaw, Saskatchewan, Reed has four children – one daughter and three sons – and currently resides in suburban St. Louis.

Career statistics

Playing career 
 June 22, 1996 – Drafted by the St. Louis Blues 177th overall in the 1996 NHL Entry Draft
 July 27, 2006 – Signed as a free agent by the Chicago Blackhawks
 November 3, 2006 – Sent to the minors

References

External links

1976 births
Living people
Baton Rouge Kingfish players
Canadian ice hockey right wingers
Chicago Blackhawks players
Sportspeople from Moose Jaw
Moose Jaw Warriors players
St. Louis Blues draft picks
St. Louis Blues players
Ice hockey people from Saskatchewan